National Public School, Banashankari  is a school located in Bangalore, India established in 2013. It is headed by Dr. K. P. Gopalkrishna.

About 
The school is affiliated to Central Board of Secondary Education and follows their system of teaching and examination. 

The school started in 2013 and the first batch of 12th grade students graduated in the academic year 2015-16. The school is located in Uttarahalli

Infrastructure 
 Library
 Science Labs
 Computer Lab
 Auditorium
 Sports Facilities
Swimming pool

References

Private schools in Bangalore
High schools and secondary schools in Bangalore